The 2017 President's Cup is the 67th season of the President's Cup. Club Eagles are the defending champions, having beaten TC Sports Club in last season's final, winning their first President's Cup gold.

Broadcasting rights

The broadcasting rights for all the matches of 2017 Maldives President's Cup were given to the Public Service Media.

Qualifier
Top 4 teams after the end of 2017 Dhivehi Premier League will be qualified for the President's Cup.

Final qualifier

Semi-final qualifier

Semi-final

Final

Statistics

Scorers

Assists

References

President's Cup (Maldives)
Pres